Max Harrop (born 30 June 1993 in Oldham, Greater Manchester) is an English football midfielder who plays for Curzon Ashton. He previously played for Bury in the Football League.

Playing career
Harrop spent his youth at the Liverpool Academy, but transferred to the Bury youth team as a teenager. He was awarded the 'Promising Newcomer of the Season' award at the club for his progress in 2009–10. He made his first team debut on 26 March 2011, replacing Kyle Bennett 79 minutes into a goalless draw with Port Vale at Vale Park.

He signed a new two-year contract with Bury in June 2011.

On December 2011 it was announced that Max had signed on a months loan with Conference North side Blyth Spartans. He returned to Bury during February having been recalled by the parent club.

In October 2012 Harrop was sent out on loan again, this time to Conference North club Hinckley United, scoring on his debut.

Nantwich Town F.C.
On his release from Bury he joined Nantwich Town in the summer of 2013. He made his debut for The Dabbers against King's Lynn Town F.C. on 17 August 2013. Harrop scored his first goal against Stocksbridge Park Steels F.C. on 7 September 2013.

Ashton United F.C
On 14 March 2015, he signed for Ashton United. He scored his first goal against Rushall Olympic on 25 April 2015

Ramsbottom United F.C.
In August, 2015, he left Ashton United for Ramsbottom United, joining his older brother Kyle Harrop. Max scored his first goal against Whitby Town F.C on 26 August 2015.

Nantwich Town F.C.
Harrop signed with Nantwich Town F.C. on 24 March, and marked his return by scoring the winning goal, coming off the bench against Barwell F.C. on 26 March.

Altrincham F.C. 
On 11 August 2017, Harrop signed for Altrincham, on the eve of their first game of the season. In his first season with Altrincham, the club were champions of the Northern Premier League.

Curzon Ashton F.C. 
On 27 August 2020, Harrop signed for Curzon Ashton.

References

External links

Profile at the official Altrincham FC website

1993 births
Living people
People from Oldham
English footballers
Footballers from Oldham
Association football midfielders
Bury F.C. players
Blyth Spartans A.F.C. players
Hinckley United F.C. players
Tamworth F.C. players
English Football League players
Nantwich Town F.C. players
Ramsbottom United F.C. players
Ashton United F.C. players
Altrincham F.C. players
Curzon Ashton F.C. players